John Van Eyssen (born Matthew John Du Toit Van Eyssen, 19 March 1922 – 13 November 1995) was a South African born actor, agent and film production executive. He moved to Britain following the Second World War, attending the Central School of Speech and Drama. In 1951 and in 1954 he played the role of Lucifer in the York Cycle of Mystery Plays, first revived in 1951 as part of the Festival of Britain.

Van Eyssen appeared in films from 1950 as well as on stage (playing Cassio in Orson Welles' 1951 production of Othello, for example) but achieved his greatest fame as an actor when he portrayed Jonathan Harker in the Hammer Film Productions version of Dracula (released as Horror of Dracula in the US) in 1958.

He left acting in 1961 to become head of the Grade Organisation literary agency. His subsequent clients were Franco Zeffirelli, Tennessee Williams and Arthur Miller. He left the business in 1965 to work for the UK division of Columbia Pictures, eventually becoming Managing Director in July 1969. Among the films he oversaw were A Man for All Seasons (1966), Born Free (1966), Georgy Girl (1966), To Sir, with Love (1967), The Taming of The Shrew (1967), and Oliver! (1968). Both Oliver! and A Man for All Seasons won Best Picture Academy Awards. In 1970, he was promoted to Worldwide Head of Production (ex-USA) and moved to New York.

After his tenure at Columbia, Van Eyssen became an independent producer, returning to the UK in 1991 to establish Britain's premier showcase for talented young filmmakers, the Chelsea Film Festival. He was longtime companion to Ingrid Bergman in the years before her death in 1982.

His son, David Van Eyssen, is a visual artist, and a producer-director known for the science fiction streaming series RCVR.

Filmography

References

External links
 

South African male film actors
Literary agents
1922 births
1995 deaths
South African film producers
South African male stage actors
20th-century South African male actors
Alumni of the Royal Central School of Speech and Drama
South African emigrants to the United Kingdom